2XL or 2-XL may refer to:

2XL, a large U.S. standard clothing size
2XL (TV series), a Polish drama television series
2-XL, an educational toy robot
Laze & Royal, an American hip hop group formerly known as 2XL
Soul Militia, an Estonian hip hop group formerly known as 2XL, winner of the 2001 Eurovision Song Contest
XLFM, an Australian radio station formerly known as 2XL